Serhiy Fedorovych Siminin (born 9 October 1987) is a Ukrainian professional footballer who plays as a defender for Lviv in the Ukrainian Second League.

Career
Siminin is the product of Zorya Luhansk Youth School system where he was first trained by Serhiy Mayorov. In November 2022 his contract with Karpaty Lviv was ended.

References

External links
 

 Official Website Profile

1987 births
Living people
Ukrainian footballers
FC Zorya Luhansk players
FC Volyn Lutsk players
FC Helios Kharkiv players
FC Vorskla Poltava players
FC Oleksandriya players
Ukrainian Premier League players
Ukrainian First League players
Ukrainian Second League players
NK Veres Rivne players
FC Lviv players
FC Karpaty Lviv players
Association football defenders